Trouble Along the Way is a 1953 comedy film directed by Michael Curtiz and starring John Wayne and Donna Reed, with a supporting cast including Charles Coburn and Marie Windsor. The black-and-white film was released by Warner Bros. with an aspect ratio of 1.37:1.

Plot
Small, obscure St. Anthony's College, a Catholic university, is in dire financial straits and about to be closed. To save it, and himself from forced retirement, elderly rector Father Burke (Charles Coburn) hires a down-and-out former big-time football coach, Steve Williams (John Wayne), in hopes of building a lucrative sports program. First turning down the job, Williams later accepts it when he learns that his former wife, Anne (Marie Windsor), now remarried, complained to Social Services that he is an unfit father and plans to sue for custody of their 11-year-old daughter, Carole (Sherry Jackson). Anne’s actual aim is not to get Carole, in whom she has no interest, but rather to pressure Steve into having an affair with her.

Social Services worker Alice Singleton (Donna Reed), coldly prejudiced against Steve because she suffered from a relationship with her father similar to that between Steve and Carole, is preparing a report in Anne’s favor. Steve attempts to charm Alice and win her over. Desperate to have the football program pay off, Father Burke uses his clerical connections to schedule St. Anthony's against high profile Catholic colleges — Villanova, Notre Dame, etc. — in the upcoming season. Faced with physically inadequate players, Steve uses chicanery to enroll beefy star athletes as freshmen and build a winning team. Father Burke learns of Steve’s dishonest methods, reprimands him and disbands the sports program, knowing this will cause St. Anthony’s to close. Alice submits a report unfavorable to Steve, but she repudiates it in the court custody hearing after recognizing her bias and Anne's lack of honest affection for Carole. Alice also testifies that Steve isn't a properly responsible parent, and under questioning reveals she is in love with him.

The judge halts proceedings and places Carole in custody of the State. He assigns her a new case worker until matters can be sorted out. In a surprise move, the Church agrees to continue funding St. Anthony's. Burke nevertheless resigns as rector, believing that he had been behaving selfishly to unnecessarily prolong his position. Before leaving, he reinstates Steve as coach and forgives him his unscrupulous behavior as it was done out of love for his child. The film ends with Carole, accompanied by Alice, walking away from Steve, with the implication that Steve and Alice will wed and the three would be together as a family.

Cast
 John Wayne as Steve Aloysius Williams
 Donna Reed as Alice Singleton
 Charles Coburn as Father Burke
 Tom Tully as Father Malone
 Sherry Jackson as Carole Williams
 Marie Windsor as Anne McCormick
 Tom Helmore as Harold McCormick
 Dabbs Greer as Father Peterson
 Leif Erickson as Father Provincial
 Douglas Spencer as Procurator
 Lester Matthews as Cardinal O'Shea
 Chuck Connors as Stan Schwegler
 James Dean as Football Spectator

Production
Portions of the film were shot at Pomona College and Loyola Marymount University, and various Los Angeles high schools, including Loyola High. Max Steiner provided the music.

Reception
The New York Times gave it a favorable review, citing "spirited and contemporary" dialogue.

Saying that Wayne was "completely at home" in the role, Variety also found the lines, "a principal factor" in carrying the film. Craig Butler found the film predictable yet heart warming.

See also
 John Wayne filmography

References

External links
 
 
 
 

1953 films
1953 comedy-drama films
American black-and-white films
American comedy-drama films
American football films
1950s English-language films
Films about Catholic priests
Films about divorce
Films directed by Michael Curtiz
Films scored by Max Steiner
Films set in universities and colleges
James Dean
1950s American films